Ormuri (Pashto: ارموری ژبه) ; literally, "Ormuri language") also known as Baraki, Ormur, Ormui or Bargista  is an Eastern Iranian language spoken in Southeast Afghanistan and Waziristan. It is primarily spoken by the Burki people in the town of Kaniguram in South Waziristan and Logar, Afghanistan. The language belongs to the Eastern-Iranian language group. The extremely small number of speakers makes Ormuri an endangered language that is considered to be in a "threatened" state.

Ormuri is notable for its unusual sound inventory, which includes a voiceless alveolar trill that does not exist in the surrounding Pashto. Ormuri also has voiceless and voiced alveolo-palatal fricatives (the voiceless being contrastive with the more common voiceless palato-alveolar fricative), which also exist in the Waziristani dialect of Pashto, but could have been adopted from Ormuri due to its close proximity.

Classification
Ormuri is classified under the Indo-European, Indo-Iranian, Iranian, Eastern Iranian, Southeastern Iranian, and Ormuri-Parachi language groups

Language status
According to the Endangered Languages Project, the language of Ormuri is highly threatened. The language is used for face-to-face communication, however it is losing users.

History
The Ormuri language is used by the Ormur/Baraki tribe in parts of the Kaniguram Valley in Waziristan, Pakistan. The language is also used in a small part of Logar Province, Afghanistan. Zoroastrian Traces along the Upper Amu Darya (Oxus)]. D. A. Scott, The Journal of the Royal Asiatic Society of Great Britain and Ireland, No. 2 (1984), pp. 217–228, Published by Cambridge University Press</ref>

Ormuri tribe
An alternate name used by the Ormur people is Baraki. It is believed that there were eight to ten thousand families in the Logar area at the beginning of the 19th century and approximately four to five hundred families in Kaniguram at the beginning of the 20th century. The Ormur tribe does not occupy an ethnically homogeneous territory. In Afghanistan, the Ormur people live in mixed communities with both Tajiks and Pashtun. Whereas, in Pakistan, the Ormur people live only with the Pashtuns.

Early history of the tribe can be traced in Herodotus' book. The Persian Emperor Darius Hystaspes; Governor of Egypt conquered the Greek colonies of Barca and Cyrene in Libya and took them to Egypt on their return from expedition. At this time, the King returned from his Scythian campaign to his capital, Susa. The Barakis were given a village in Bactria to live in, later named Barke. After two thousand three hundred and fifty years, the village was still inhabited in 1891 within the same territory.

Ormuri language
The name 'Ormur' (orməṛ) is originally derived from Pashto (meaning fire). The first man to have made mention of the Baraki language was Babar, in his book Baburnama. Ormuri, also called Birki at the time was one of the eleven to twelve tongues that were observed by Babar while in the region of Kabul. It is known that many of the Ormuri speakers are at least bilingual or trilingual, speaking other tribal languages such as Pashto, Persian, Dari, or Kaboli

Pir Roshan (Bayazid Khan) was one of the first known Pashto prose writers and composers of Pashto alphabets who used several Ormuri words in his book "Khairul-Bayan." A few of the words that were used within his book were Nalattti (Pigs), Nmandzak of Mazdak (Mosque), Teshtan (Owner), Burghu (flout), Haramunai (ill-born), etc.

Research 

Hikmatyar Burki has also done an MPhil on Ormuri and published his work through the Pashto Academy.

Geographic distribution
Ormuri is spoken primarily in the town of Kaniguram in South Waziristan, Pakistan. A small population also speaks it in the town of Baraki Barak in Logar Province, Afghanistan. The language is sustained by nearly fifty adherents in Afghanistan and around five to six thousand speakers in Pakistan

Dialects
There are two dialects of Ormuri; one is spoken in Kaniguram, Waziristan, which is the more archaic dialect, and the other one in Baraki-Barak, Logar. The Kaniguram dialect is not understood in Baraki-Barak. The linguist Georg Morgenstierne wrote: 

The dialect of Kaniguram is currently strong, spoken by a relatively prosperous community of Ormur in an isolated part of the rugged Waziristan hills. However, the position of the dialect of Baraki Barak is not strong. Morgenstierne wrote he was told that:

Language structure

Phonology

Lexical differences

Differences in phonetic forms

The vowel system of Ormuri is characterized as heterogenous. The language consists of a subsystem of vowels that found native within Ormuri vocabulary, as well as a subsystem of vowels that is considered "borrowed vocabulary." The differences seen between the Logar and Kaniguram dialects are mainly based on the quality of vowels instead of the quantity.

The system is based on six phonemes: i, e, a, å, o, u.

The consonant system varies slightly between both the dialects of Kaniguram and Logar. The Logar native consonant system contains 25 phonemes, while the Kaniguram system has 27.

Syllabic Patterns
Proper Ormuri words will have the following syllabic patterns: V, VC, CV, CCV, (C)VCC, CVC, CCVC, CCVCC. Both dialects from Kaniguram and Logar have similar syllabic structure.

Examples
a- this
un/wun- so much
pe- father
gri- mountain
åxt- eight
måx- we
spok- dog
breš- burn
broxt- burned
wroxt- beard

At the end of certain words CC occurs as spirant/sonant + occlusive. When separating most words into syllables, a medial CC will be divided:
al-gox-tok- to fall
kir-ží- hen
er-zåk- to come

Morphology
The language has undergone extensive change in comparison to its ancestral self. For nominal morphology (nouns, adjectives, and pronouns), aspects of the Kaniguram dialect of grammatical gender has completely been lost in the Logar. In terms of the verbal morphology, there is a greater variety of conjugations of modal and tense-aspect forms based on the present-tense stem. There is also a distinction made between masculine and feminine words based on the past-tense system. Finally, there is a greater number of distinctions between within the system of tense-aspect forms and there are different types of ergative constructions.

There is a developed system of noun and verb inflections. Nominal parts of speech contains: Three numbers (singular, dual, and plural), three genders (masculine, feminine, and neuter), and the verb has two voices (active and middle). There is the elimination of the category of case (loss in nouns, adjectives, numerals, and certain pronouns). There is also a complete loss of the category of gender, varying on the dialect (Complete loss in Logar and rudimentary masculine and feminine forms remain in Kaniguram). In Logar most original Ormuri nouns and adjectives have a simple stem ending in a consonant and a few nouns end in unstressed (or rarely stressed) -a or -i. Whereas in Kaniguram, the stem usually ends in a consonant, but both nouns and adjectives may end in -a or -i.

Alphabets 
Ormuri uses the Pashto script with the additional letters  /r̝/ ,    /ʑ/  and  /ɕ/  :

Examples
"Log." will represent examples from the Ormuri dialect of Logar and "Kan." will be used to signify the Kaniguram dialect of Ormuri

Log.: afo kåbol-ki altsok → "He went off to Kabul"
Log.: a-saṛay dzok šuk → "(This) man has been beaten"
Log.: xodåay-an bad-e badtarin såton → "O God, keep us from misfortune" (literal translation: "From the very worst")
Kan.: a-nar by pa mun ǰoṛawak sa → "The house is being built by me"
Kan.: sabā su az kābul-ki tsom → "Tomorrow I shall probably go to Kabul"
Kan.: tsami a-dāru irwar! → "Bring my eye drops"

Resources 

 Ormuri Primer
 Qawaid e Bargistā (in Hindustani)
 The Ormuri Language in Past and Present
 Linguistic Survey of India (Volume 10): Ormuri at pages 123 to 325
 Indo-Iranian Frontier Languages (Volume 1): Parachi and Ormuri
Clitics of Ormuri

See also
Ormur
 Waziri Pashto
Parachi language
Waneci
Burki
Baraki
Logar Province
Kaniguram

References

External links
Ormuri at The Endangered Languages Project
Ormuri and Bargista Language
Ormuri and Parachi Language Analysis by Georg Morgenstierne
Ormuri Phonetics
Ormuri Alphabet by Rozi Khan Burki
Ormuri History and Origin by The Journal of the Royal Asiatic Society of Great Britain and Ireland
Word list of terms in Ormuri and other languages

Eastern Iranian languages
Languages of Pakistan
Languages of Afghanistan
Languages of Khyber Pakhtunkhwa